Tłuściec  is a village in the administrative district of Gmina Międzyrzec Podlaski, within Biała Podlaska County, Lublin Voivodeship, in eastern Poland.

The village has a population of 77 people

References

Villages in Biała Podlaska County
Kholm Governorate
Lublin Voivodeship (1919–1939)